Sayoko (written: 小夜子, 紗代子, 佐代子, 沙代子, 彩世子 or 咲世子)  is a feminine Japanese given name. Notable people with the name include:

, Japanese actress
, Japanese singer-songwriter and actress
, Japanese archer
, Japanese sports journalist and television announcer
, Japanese actress and model
, Japanese model
, Japanese model and actress

Fictional characters
, a character in the manga series Oh My Goddess!
, a character in the anime series Code Geass
, a character in The Idolmaster Million Live!

See also
 Sayaka
 Yoko (name)

Japanese feminine given names